Stormbringer! is a 1970 album released by John and Beverley Martyn. It has no connection to Michael Moorcock's 1965 Elric novel of the same name. John Martyn wrote six of the ten songs and Beverley four. The album was recorded under the direction of Paul Harris in Woodstock, New York.

Two of the tracks feature the drumming of Levon Helm, from the Band – who had an influence on John Martyn's music.

Track listing
All tracks composed by John Martyn except where indicated.

"Go Out and Get It"
"Can't Get The One I Want" (Beverley Martyn)
"Stormbringer"
"Sweet Honesty" (Beverley Martyn)
"Woodstock"
"John The Baptist" 
"The Ocean" (Beverley Martyn)
"Traffic-Light Lady"
"Tomorrow Time" (Beverley Martyn)
"Would You Believe Me?"

The remastered CD issue contained the following previously unreleased tracks:
"One of Those Days" 
"I Don't Know"  
"John The Baptist" 
"Traffic-Light Lady"
The bonus tracks were recorded during a demo session at Sound Techniques Studios, Chelsea on 16 April 1969

Personnel
John Martyn - vocals, acoustic guitar, electric guitar
Beverley Martyn - vocals, acoustic guitar
Harvey Brooks - bass 
Paul Harris - piano, organ, musical direction, arrangements
John Simon - harpsichord on "Tomorrow Time"
Levon Helm - drums on "Sweet Honesty" and "John The Baptist"
Herbie Lovelle - drums on "Stormbringer!" and "Would You Believe Me"
Billy Mundi - drums on "Go Out and Get It"
Technical
John Wood - engineer
Nigel Waymouth - front cover design
Hiroshi - photography

References

External links
John Martyn's Official Website
The Beverley Martyn Website

John Martyn albums
1970 albums
Albums produced by Joe Boyd
Island Records albums
Warner Records albums
Beverley Martyn albums